Streptomyces prasinus is a bacterium species from the genus of Streptomyces which has been isolated from soil on Mallorca in Spain. Streptomyces prasinus produces prasinomycin, validamycin, prasinon A and prasinon B.

See also 
 List of Streptomyces species

References

Further reading

External links
Type strain of Streptomyces prasinus at BacDive -  the Bacterial Diversity Metadatabase	

prasinus
Bacteria described in 1958